Which Shall It Be? is a 1924 American silent drama film directed by Renaud Hoffman and starring Willis Marks, Ethel Wales, and David Torrence.

Plot
As described in a film magazine review, John Moore and his wife are hard-working parents of six, struggling from morn till night in a valiant effort to give their children all the necessities of life. It is a herculean task, and when they receive an offer from a wealthy relative, of ease and physical comfort for the rest of their lives in exchange for one of the children, they decide to accept. However, they are stopped by the thought of which child to give up to their relative. After much speculation and conflicting thought, they decide on the oldest girl. She no sooner takes leave than the mother suffers terrible remorse. Just  when it seems as though her heart must break, the daughter appears and flies to her mother's arms. The father, who had driven her off in his buggy, simply could not, as it turned out, "say  good-bye," and the happy family is reunited once more.

Cast

References

Bibliography
 Munden, Kenneth White. The American Film Institute Catalog of Motion Pictures Produced in the United States, Part 1. University of California Press, 1997.

External links
 

1924 films
1924 drama films
1920s English-language films
American silent feature films
Silent American drama films
American black-and-white films
Films directed by Renaud Hoffman
Films distributed by W. W. Hodkinson Corporation
1920s American films